Auden High School, Banashankari is a co-ed English medium school in Bangalore. It was established in 1981 by Sri. N. Ramanna in the name of W. H. Auden, a great English poet. It is located in Banashankari 3rd Stage 2nd Phase.

The school is affiliated to the Karnataka State Board from 1st to 10th standard. School has CBSE board for 8th standard. The medium of instruction is English.

The institution is one of the first few ISO 9000-2001 certified institutions in South India.

Sister institutions
 Auden Public School - Girinagar, Banashankari 3rd Stage, Bangalore - 85

References

External links
 School website

High schools and secondary schools in Bangalore